Cyclograpsus is a genus of crabs, containing the following species:

Cyclograpsus audouinii H. Milne-Edwards, 1837
Cyclograpsus barbatus (MacLeay, 1838)
Cyclograpsus beccarii Nobili, 1899
Cyclograpsus cinereus Dana, 1851
Cyclograpsus escondidensis Rathbun, 1933
Cyclograpsus eydouxi H. Milne-Edwards, 1853
Cyclograpsus granulatus Dana, 1851
Cyclograpsus granulosus H. Milne-Edwards, 1853
Cyclograpsus henshawi Rathbun, 1902
Cyclograpsus incisus Shen, 1940
Cyclograpsus insularum Campbell & Griffin, 1966
Cyclograpsus integer H. Milne-Edwards, 1837
Cyclograpsus intermedius Ortmann, 1894
Cyclograpsus lavauxi H. Milne-Edwards, 1853
Cyclograpsus longipes Stimpson, 1858
Cyclograpsus lucidus Dai, Yang, Song & Chen, 1986
Cyclograpsus punctatus H. Milne-Edwards, 1837
Cyclograpsus sanctaecrucis Griffin, 1968
Cyclograpsus unidens Nobili, 1905

Around three further species are known only from fossils, dating from the Miocene:
Cyclograpsus directus Karasawa, 1989
Cyclograpsus rectangularis Karasawa, 1989

References

Grapsoidea
Extant Miocene first appearances
Taxa named by Henri Milne-Edwards